Natalie Bawden is a female former international table tennis player from England.

Table tennis career
She represented England at two World Table Tennis Championships, in 2001 and 2006, in the Corbillon Cup (women's team event).

She won two English National Table Tennis Championships doubles titles in 2005 and 2007. Her representative county is Essex.
 
Natalie Bawden is currently assistant coach at Grantham College and coaches one of the future English stars Raquel Sao Pedro

See also
 List of England players at the World Team Table Tennis Championships

References

Living people
1984 births
English female table tennis players